"Last Night" is a song by the British pop rock band The Vamps. It was released in the United Kingdom on 6 April 2014 as the third single from their first studio album, Meet the Vamps (2014). The song was written by Wayne Hector, TMS and Ayak Thiik and was produced by TMS. It entered the UK Singles Chart at number two, matching the success of "Can We Dance".

Background
On 20 February 2014, The Vamps announced that "Last Night" would be their next single.

Critical reception
Lewis Corner of Digital Spy gave the song a mixed review, writing:"Co-written by hit-maker Wayne Hector (One Direction, Nicki Minaj), 'Last Night' is a sugary pop-rock anthem packed with carefree youth and mischief. "Yeah last night I think we were dancing/ Singing all our favourite songs," they recollect over fizzy guitar riffs and jump-around beats, before they coyly admit: "Think I might have kissed someone." It unashamedly plays up to its target audience, but with pop hooks more chewy and sweet than jelly beans, it has all the potential to pull in the larger crowd."

Music video
The music video was uploaded to YouTube on 26 February 2014. As of December 31, 2019, the video has almost 39 million views.

Track listing
Digital download
 "Last Night" – 3:07

Digital download - EP
 "Last Night" (Gospel version) – 2:53
 "Oh Cecilia (Breaking My Heart)" [Live From The O2 Arena] – 4:25
 "What About Love" – 3:24
 "Lovestruck" – 3:40
 "Last Night" (WestFunk Club remix) – 4:46

Digital download - Remix EP
 "Last Night" (Live at the O2) – 3:20
 "Last Night" (Connor's Version) – 3:10
 "Last Night" (Tristan's Animal Remix) – 3:52

CD1
"Last Night" - 3:07
"Surfin USA"
"High Hopes"
"Story of My Life" (Live)

CD2
"Last Night" (Connor's version) - 3:10
"All I Want" (James' version)

DVD
"Last Night" (Music video) - 3:07
"Carry on Vamping on Tour" (documentary)

Charts and certifications

Charts

Certifications

Release history

References

The Vamps (British band) songs
2014 songs
2014 singles
Virgin EMI Records singles
Mercury Records singles
Songs written by Wayne Hector
Songs written by Peter Kelleher (songwriter)
Songs written by Tom Barnes (songwriter)
Songs written by Ben Kohn
Song recordings produced by TMS (production team)